Chayanne (born 1968) is a Puerto Rican singer.

Chayanne may also refer to:
Chayanne (1987 album)
Chayanne (1988 album)
Puerto Rico Highway 203, also known as Chayanne Expressway

See also
Cheyenne (disambiguation)